Robert "Bob" Eugene Bruggers (born April 20, 1944) is an American retired American football player  and professional wrestler. Bruggers played as a linebacker for five seasons for the Miami Dolphins and San Diego Chargers in the American Football League (AFL) and National Football League (NFL).

Early life 
Bruggers was born on April 20, 1944 in Lincoln, Nebraska. He was a highly decorated basketball player at Danube High School. After graduating high school, he attended the University of Minnesota, where he was a collegiate basketball player before refocusing on American football.

Football career

Professional wrestling career 
After his football career ended, Bruggers was introduced to professional wrestling by Wahoo McDaniel, a fellow former Miami Dolphin. Bruggers was trained as a professional wrestler by Verne Gagne and Billy Robinson, making his debut in 1972 for Gagne's Minneapolis, Minnesota-based American Wrestling Association. In 1973, he began wrestling for Championship Wrestling from Florida. Reflecting his football past, he used a Football tackle as his finishing move. In September 1973, he made a brief tour of Japan with International Wrestling Enterprise.

In late 1973, Bruggers began wrestling for Mid-Atlantic Championship Wrestling. In March 1974, he began teaming with Paul Jones, and on April 8, 1974, they defeated The Andersons to win the NWA Mid-Atlantic Tag Team Championship. Bruggers and Jones held the championship until July 4, 1974, when they were defeated by Ric Flair and Rip Hawk.

Bruggers' career came to abrupt end on October 4, 1975. With Bruggers needing to drive from his home in Kingstree, South Carolina to Wilmington, North Carolina for an event, promoter Jim Crockett Jr., who was ill with influenza, invited him to instead take his place on a Cessna 310 that he had chartered. Bruggers took a seat on the plane along with Crockett's brother David and fellow wrestlers Ric Flair, Johnny Valentine, and Tim Woods. Shortly before reaching its destination, the plane ran out of fuel and crashed. The pilot, Mike Farkas, sustained ultimately fatal injuries and all five passengers were injured, with Bruggers suffering spinal fractures and a broken ankle. After having steel rods inserted into his spinal column, Bruggers was able to walk out of hospital three weeks after the crash, but decided not to return to wrestling.

Retirement 
Following the end of his professional wrestling career, Bruggers relocated to West Palm Beach, Florida, where in 1978 he opened a bar using an insurance settlement he had received after the crash.

Championships and accomplishments 
Mid-Atlantic Championship Wrestling
NWA Mid-Atlantic Tag Team Championship (1 time) – with Paul Jones

References

External links 
 
 

1944 births
American football linebackers
American male professional wrestlers
Living people
Miami Dolphins players
Minnesota Golden Gophers football players
Minnesota Golden Gophers men's basketball players
Professional wrestlers from Minnesota
San Diego Chargers players
Sportspeople from Lincoln, Nebraska
Survivors of aviation accidents or incidents
University of Minnesota alumni
American Football League players
American men's basketball players